Robert Friedman may refer to:

 Robert I. Friedman (1950–2002), American investigative journalist
 Robert Friedman (producer) (born 1956), businessman in the entertainment industry